Lukman Sardi (born July 14, 1971) is an Indonesian actor of Javanese-Bugis descent. He is the son of Indonesian violinist Idris Sardi and a grandson of Indonesian actress, Hadidjah.

Early life and career
Lukman Sardi was born on July 14, 1971, in Jakarta, Indonesia. Lukman is a son of the legend violinist musician Idris Sardi and is a grandchild of Mas Sardi. Sardi began career as actor when he played in the 1980s film, Anak-Anak Tak Beribu. Previously, Sardi had starring some films, like Kembang-Kembang Plastik and Pengemis dan Tukang Becak. But, he only starring as minor role.

Personal life
In December 2009, Sardi married Pricillia Pullunggono, who is 13 years younger than he is. After married for 6 years, Sardi had three son, named Akiva Dishan Ranu Sardi, Akira Deshawn Yi Obelom Sardi, and Akino Dashan Kaimana Sardi.

In June 2015, Sardi started a controversy regarding his conversion from Islam to Christianity. This rumor had occurred when Sardi be to be a testimony in the anniversary events of Indonesian Bethel Church Ecclesia, which was uploaded in YouTube on May 24, 2015. Sardi admits that changing religion is not a compulsion but a call from the heart. It is revealed by him on 30 March 2022 that his conversion was because of spiritual discontentment he experienced during his trip during umrah that led him to convert his religion.

Filmography

Film

Television

Director

Awards and nominations

External links

References

Maya Award winners
Citra Award winners
Living people
Javanese people
1971 births
Indonesian actors
Indonesian former Muslims
Indonesian Christians
Converts to Protestantism from Islam
Former Muslims